The E.K. Schuetz House is a historic house located in Wausau, Wisconsin. It was added to the National Register of Historic Places in 1980.

The house was designed in simple Colonial Revival style by Eschweiler and built in 1922 for E.K. Schuetz. Schuetz was a founder of the Wausau Motor Parts Company and son-in-law of C.F. Dunbar, whose house lies behind this one. The house is within the East Hill Residential Historic District.

References

Houses in Marathon County, Wisconsin
Colonial Revival architecture in Wisconsin
Houses completed in 1922
Houses on the National Register of Historic Places in Wisconsin
National Register of Historic Places in Marathon County, Wisconsin
1922 establishments in Wisconsin